Milo's Hamburgers, known colloquially simply as Milo's, is a regional fast food restaurant chain based in Alabama, United States, founded by Milo Carlton as Milo's Hamburger Shop in 1946. As of 2021, Milo's has with 20 locations across Alabama. A signature menu item is a secret-recipe hamburger sauce, and Sweet Tea. One location in Tuscaloosa, was destroyed in the EF4 tornado on April 27, 2011, and a new Milo's was recently constructed in a new location. The chains slogan is "Everybody goes to... Milo's"

History
The restaurant was established by Milo Carlton, who, on April 16, 1946, opened Milo's Hamburger Shop in Birmingham, at 31st Street and 12th Avenue North.  The restaurant moved to 2820 10th Avenue North in 1963.  Milo's began selling franchises in 1983; the first franchise location, at 509 18th Street South in Birmingham, opened February 7, 1983.   Since the 1980s, they also distribute their own tea brand in Alabama, Arkansas, Colorado, Georgia, Mississippi, Louisiana, Missouri, Tennessee, as well as parts of the Florida panhandle, Hawaii, Illinois, Indiana, Kentucky, Missouri, Ohio, Oklahoma, South Carolina, Virginia, Washington, West Virginia, and Wisconsin.  The tea company split off in 2002.

See also
Jack's (another original hamburger fast food restaurant, based in Alabama)
 List of hamburger restaurants

References

External links
 Milo's Hamburgers home page
 Milo's Tea home page

Companies based in Birmingham, Alabama
Fast-food hamburger restaurants
Fast-food chains of the United States
Regional restaurant chains in the United States
Restaurants in Birmingham, Alabama
Restaurants established in 1946
1946 establishments in Alabama